Results of India women's national football team from 2010 to 2019.

Legend

‡ are unofficial friendly matches after 1994, that are Non FIFA A international matches and are not considered for FIFA rankings.

2010

2011

2012

2013

2014

2015

2016

2017

2018

2019

‡ are unofficial friendly matches after 1994, that are Non FIFA A international matches and are not considered for FIFA rankings.

See also
India women's national football team results (2000–2009)
India women's national football team results (2020–present)

References

2010